Basketball in the 2006 Central American and Caribbean Games took place in the Coliseo Cubierto Base Naval in Cartagena, Colombia from the July 16 to July 22 for women and July 24 to July 30 for men. Each competition had 6 teams.

Medalist

Men's

First round

Semifinals

Bronze-medal game

Gold-medal game

References

basketball
2006–07 in North American basketball
Basketball at the Central American and Caribbean Games
International basketball competitions hosted by Colombia